Michael Connelly (1843 – November 10, 1881) was a United States Navy sailor and a Medal of Honor recipient for his role in the American Civil War. He served under the name John Mack.

Born in 1843 in Brooksville, Maine, Connelly joined the Navy from that state. On that day and the next, he accompanied a Union Army force during the Battle of Natural Bridge near St. Marks, Florida. He helped transport and fire a naval howitzer throughout the engagement despite heavy Confederate fire. For this action, he was awarded the Medal of Honor three months later, on June 22, 1865; the medal was issued under the name "John Mack". He was one of six sailors to receive the medal for manning artillery pieces during the battle, the others being Landsman John S. Lann, Seaman George Pyne, Ordinary Seaman Charles Read, Coxswain George Schutt, and Seaman Thomas Smith.

Connelly's official Medal of Honor citation reads:
As seaman on board the U.S.S. Hendrick Hudson, St. Marks, Fla., 5 and 6 March 1865, Mack served with the Army in charge of Navy howitzers during the attack on St. Marks and, throughout this fierce engagement, made remarkable efforts in assisting transport of the gun. His coolness and determination in courageously standing by his gun while under the fire of the enemy were a credit to the service to which he belonged.

He is buried in Saint Mary's Cemetery in Lynn, Massachusetts. His grave can be found in Section 6, Row 6, Lot 18.

See also

 List of American Civil War Medal of Honor recipients: M–P

References

External links
  – under the name John Mack

1843 births
1881 deaths
United States Navy Medal of Honor recipients
People from Brooksville, Maine
People from Lynn, Massachusetts
Union Navy sailors
American Civil War recipients of the Medal of Honor